Create with Garfield is a 1986 educational computer game based on Jim Davis' Garfield comic strip, developed by Ahead Designs and published by Development Learning Materials. It was released for Apple II, Commodore 64 and IBM PC. A deluxe edition was released in 1987; it featured two disks (one containing additional character and prop sprites), improved printer drivers and a shortcut for returning to a previous screen. It is the first video game based on Garfield comics to be released. A companion disk was released in 1989.

Content
The game allows players to make Garfield cartoons with pieces of artwork featuring characters, props, backgrounds, and text. The game functions with a drag-and-drop system used by a keyboard, mouse or joystick. Cartoons can be printed and/or saved to disk.

Reception
Eric Holroyd, in a review for the Australian Apple Review, recommended the game for Garfield fans, especially if mixed with the similar game Teddy Bear-rels of Fun, claiming that "The added bonus of mixing and matching the two will give endless hours of fun for you, your family and your friends".

References

External links
  on GameSpot
  on Giant Bomb

1986 video games
Apple II games
Commodore 64 games
DOS games
Video games based on Garfield
Children's educational video games
Video games developed in the United States